Filobacterium rodentium is a species of bacteria, the only species in the genus Filobacterium and the family Filobacteriaceae.

References

Sphingobacteriia
Monotypic bacteria genera